Uma Nath Singh (born 15 January 1954) is an Indian Judge and former Chief Justice of Meghalaya High Court.

Career
Singh passed from Ewing Christian College and completed a law degree from the Allahabad University in 1980. He started practice in Delhi High Court as well as in the Supreme Court of India. He also worked as Central Government advocate in Bhopal Gas Leak Disaster case. Singh became an Additional Judge in Madhya Pradesh High Court on 22 October 2001. In 2004 he was transferred to Punjab and Haryana High Court. Thereafter Singh was appointed a Judge of Allahabad High Court on 30 June 2009. He took oath as acting Chief Justice of Meghalaya High Court on 27 August 2014. On 19 March 2015 Justice Singh became the Chief Justice of Meghalaya High Court. After the retirement he was appointed Lokayukta of the state of Nagaland for few days.

References

1954 births
Living people
Indian judges
Chief Justices of the Meghalaya High Court
University of Allahabad alumni
21st-century Indian judges
Ombudsmen in India
Judges of the Allahabad High Court
Judges of the Madhya Pradesh High Court
Judges of the Punjab and Haryana High Court
Judges of the Meghalaya High Court